Ølby (meaning Beer Town in Danish or "the place where the people are making good beer") is a neighbourhood north of the town of Køge divided into two parts, the village of Ølby and east of the village near the shore of the Bay of Køge a suburb named Ølby Lyng 35 km south-west of Copenhagen, Denmark, located in the northern part of Køge. The suburb is connected with the radial line Køgebugtbanen, a part of the S-train network, at the Ølby station.

Ølby church is a small church built in 1997.

References

Neighbourhoods in Denmark
Køge Municipality